In grammar, tense is a category that expresses time reference. Tenses are usually manifested by the use of specific forms of verbs, particularly in their conjugation patterns. 

The main tenses found in many languages include the past, present, and future. Some languages have only two distinct tenses, such as past and nonpast, or future and nonfuture. There are also tenseless languages, like most of the Chinese languages, though they can possess a future and nonfuture system typical of Sino-Tibetan languages. In recent work Maria Bittner and Judith Tonhauser have described the different ways in which tenseless languages nonetheless mark time. On the other hand, some languages make finer tense distinctions, such as remote vs recent past, or near vs remote future.

Tenses generally express time relative to the moment of speaking. In some contexts, however, their meaning may be relativized to a point in the past or future which is established in the discourse (the moment being spoken about). This is called relative (as opposed to absolute) tense. Some languages have different verb forms or constructions which manifest relative tense, such as pluperfect ("past-in-the-past") and "future-in-the-past".

Expressions of tense are often closely connected with expressions of the category of aspect; sometimes what are traditionally called tenses (in languages such as Latin) may in modern analysis be regarded as combinations of tense with aspect. Verbs are also often conjugated for mood, and since in many cases the three categories are not manifested separately, some languages may be described in terms of a combined tense–aspect–mood (TAM) system.

Etymology
The English noun tense comes from Old French  "time" (spelled  in modern French through deliberate archaization), from Latin , "time".

Uses of the term
In modern linguistic theory, tense is understood as a category that expresses (grammaticalizes) time reference; namely one which, using grammatical means, places a state or action in time. Nonetheless, in many descriptions of languages, particularly in traditional European grammar, the term "tense" is applied to verb forms or constructions that express not merely position in time, but also additional properties of the state or action – particularly aspectual or modal properties.

The category of aspect expresses how a state or action relates to time – whether it is seen as a complete event, an ongoing or repeated situation, etc. Many languages make a distinction between perfective aspect (denoting complete events) and imperfective aspect (denoting ongoing or repeated situations); some also have other aspects, such as a perfect aspect, denoting a state following a prior event. Some of the traditional "tenses" express time reference together with aspectual information. In Latin and French, for example, the imperfect denotes past time in combination with imperfective aspect, while other verb forms (the Latin perfect, and the French  or ) are used for past time reference with perfective aspect.

The category of mood is used to express modality, which includes such properties as uncertainty, evidentiality, and obligation. Commonly encountered moods include the indicative, subjunctive, and conditional. Mood can be bound up with tense, aspect, or both, in particular verb forms. Hence, certain languages are sometimes analysed as having a single tense–aspect–mood (TAM) system, without separate manifestation of the three categories.
 
The term tense, then, particularly in less formal contexts, is sometimes used to denote any combination of tense proper, aspect, and mood. As regards English, there are many verb forms and constructions which combine time reference with continuous and/or perfect aspect, and with indicative, subjunctive or conditional mood. Particularly in some English language teaching materials, some or all of these forms can be referred to simply as tenses (see below).

Particular tense forms need not always carry their basic time-referential meaning in every case. For instance, the historical present is a use of the present tense to refer to past events. The phenomenon of fake tense is common crosslinguistically as a means of marking counterfactuality in conditionals and wishes.

Possible tenses

Not all languages have tense: tenseless languages include Chinese and Dyirbal. Some languages have all three basic tenses (the past, present, and future), while others have only two: some have past and nonpast tenses, the latter covering both present and future times (as in Arabic, Japanese, and, in some analyses, English), whereas others such as Greenlandic, Quechua, and Nivkh have future and nonfuture. Some languages have four or more tenses, making finer distinctions either in the past (e.g. remote vs. recent past) or in the future (e.g. near vs. remote future). The six-tense language Kalaw Lagaw Ya of Australia has the remote past, the recent past, the today past, the present, the today/near future and the remote future. Some languages, like the Amazonian Cubeo language, have a historical past tense, used for events perceived as historical.

Tenses that refer specifically to "today" are called hodiernal tenses; these can be either past or future. Apart from Kalaw Lagaw Ya, another language which features such tenses is Mwera, a Bantu language of Tanzania. It is also suggested that in 17th-century French, the passé composé served as a hodiernal past. Tenses that contrast with hodiernals, by referring to the past before today or the future after today, are called pre-hodiernal and post-hodiernal respectively. Some languages also have a crastinal tense, a future tense referring specifically to tomorrow (found in some Bantu languages); or a hesternal tense, a past tense referring specifically to yesterday (although this name is also sometimes used to mean pre-hodiernal). A tense for after tomorrow is thus called post-crastinal, and one for before yesterday is called pre-hesternal.

Another tense found in some languages, including Luganda, is the persistive tense, used to indicate that a state or ongoing action is still the case (or, in the negative, is no longer the case). Luganda also has tenses meaning "so far" and "not yet".

Some languages have special tense forms that are used to express relative tense. Tenses that refer to the past relative to the time under consideration are called anterior; these include the pluperfect (for the past relative to a past time) and the future perfect (for the past relative to a future time). Similarly, posterior tenses refer to the future relative to the time under consideration, as with the English "future-in-the-past": (he said that) he would go. Relative tense forms are also sometimes analysed as combinations of tense with aspect: the perfect aspect in the anterior case, or the prospective aspect in the posterior case.

Some languages have cyclic tense systems. This is a form of temporal marking where tense is given relative to a reference point or reference span. In Burarra, for example, events that occurred earlier on the day of speaking are marked with the same verb forms as events that happened in the far past, while events that happened yesterday (compared to the moment of speech) are marked with the same forms as events in the present. This can be thought of as a system where events are marked as prior or contemporaneous to points of reference on a time line.

Tense marking

Morphology of tense

Tense is normally indicated by the use of a particular verb form – either an inflected form of the main verb, or a multi-word construction, or both in combination. Inflection may involve the use of affixes, such as the -ed ending that marks the past tense of English regular verbs, but can also entail stem modifications, such as ablaut, as found as in the strong verbs in English and other Germanic languages, or reduplication. Multi-word tense constructions often involve auxiliary verbs or clitics. Examples which combine both types of tense marking include the French passé composé, which has an auxiliary verb together with the inflected past participle form of the main verb; and the Irish past tense, where the proclitic do (in various surface forms) appears in conjunction with the affixed or ablaut-modified past tense form of the main verb.

As has already been mentioned, indications of tense are often bound up with indications of other verbal categories, such as aspect and mood. The conjugation patterns of verbs often also reflect agreement with categories pertaining to the subject, such as person, number and gender. It is consequently not always possible to identify elements that mark any specific category, such as tense, separately from the others.

A few languages have been shown to mark tense information (as well as aspect and mood) on nouns. This may be called nominal TAM.

Languages that do not have grammatical tense, such as most Sinitic languages, express time reference chiefly by lexical means – through adverbials, time phrases, and so on. (The same is done in tensed languages, to supplement or reinforce the time information conveyed by the choice of tense.) Time information is also sometimes conveyed as a secondary feature by markers of other categories, as with the aspect markers  le and  guò, which in most cases place an action in past time. However, much time information is conveyed implicitly by context – it is therefore not always necessary, when translating from a tensed to a tenseless language, say, to express explicitly in the target language all of the information conveyed by the tenses in the source.

Syntax of tense
The syntactic properties of tense have figured prominently in formal analyses of how tense-marking interacts with word order. Some languages (such as French) allow an adverb (Adv) to intervene between a tense-marked verb (V) and its direct object (O); in other words, they permit [Verb-Adverb-Object] ordering. In contrast, other languages (such as English) do not allow the adverb to intervene between the verb and its direct object, and require [Adverb-Verb-Object] ordering. 

Tense in syntax is represented by the category label T, which is the head of a TP (tense phrase).

Tenseless language
In linguistics, a tenseless language is a language that does not have a grammatical category of tense. Tenseless languages can and do refer to time, but they do so using lexical items such as adverbs or verbs, or by using combinations of aspect, mood, and words that establish time reference. Examples of tenseless languages are Burmese, Dyirbal, most varieties of Chinese, Malay (including Indonesian),   Thai, Yukatek (Mayan), Vietnamese and in some analyses Greenlandic (Kalaallisut) and Guaraní.

In particular languages

Latin 

Latin is traditionally described as having six verb paradigms for tense (the Latin for "tense" being tempus, plural tempora):
 Present (praesēns)
 Imperfect (praeteritum imperfectum)
 Perfect (praesēns perfectum)
 Future (futūrum)
 Pluperfect (plūs quam perfectum, praeteritum perfectum)
 Future perfect (futūrum perfectum)

Imperfect verbs represent a past process combined with imperfective, that is, they stand for an ongoing past action or state at a past point in time (see secondary present). They can also represent habitual actions (see Latin tenses with modality). In contrast, perfect verbs represent completed actions. Like the imperfect, the pluperfect, the perfect and the future perfect can realise relative tenses, standing for events that are past at the time of another event (see secondary past).

Latin verbs are inflected for tense and aspect together with mood (indicative, subjunctive, infinitive, and imperative) and voice (active or passive). Most verbs can be built by selecting a verb stem and adapting them to endings. Endings may vary according to the speech role, the number and the gender of the subject or an object. Sometimes, verb groups function as a unit and supplement inflection for tense (see Latin periphrases). For details on verb structure, see Latin tenses and Latin conjugation.

Ancient Greek 

The paradigms for tenses in Ancient Greek are similar to the ones in Latin, but with a three-way aspect contrast in the past: the aorist, the perfect and the imperfect. Both aorist and imperfect verbs can represent a past event: through contrast, the imperfect verb implies a longer duration ('ate' vs 'ate for a long time'). The aorist participle represents the first event of a two-event sequence and the present participle represents an ongoing event at the time of another event. Perfect verbs stood for past affecting actions if the result was still present (e.g. "I have found it") or for present states resulting from a past event (e.g. "I remember"). For further details see Ancient Greek verbs.

The study of modern languages has been greatly influenced by the grammar of the Classical languages, since early grammarians, often monks, had no other reference point to describe their language. Latin terminology is often used to describe modern languages, sometimes with a change of meaning, as with the application of "perfect" to forms in English that do not necessarily have perfective meaning, or the words Imperfekt and Perfekt to German past tense forms that mostly lack any relationship to the aspects implied by those terms.

English
English has only two morphological tenses: the present (or non-past), as in he goes, and the past (or preterite), as in he went. The non-past usually references the present, but sometimes references the future (as in the bus leaves tomorrow). In special uses such as the historical present it can talk about the past as well. These morphological tenses are marked either with a suffix (walk(s) ~ walked) or with ablaut (sing(s) ~ sang).

In some contexts, particularly in English language teaching, various tense–aspect combinations are referred to loosely as tenses. Similarly, the term "future tense" is sometimes loosely applied to cases where modals such as will are used to talk about future points in time.

Other Indo-European languages
Proto-Indo-European verbs had present, perfect (stative), imperfect and aorist forms – these can be considered as representing two tenses (present and past) with different aspects. Most languages in the Indo-European family have developed systems either with two morphological tenses (present or "non-past", and past) or with three (present, past and future). The tenses often form part of entangled tense–aspect–mood conjugation systems. Additional tenses, tense–aspect combinations, etc. can be provided by compound constructions containing auxiliary verbs.

The Germanic languages (which include English) have present (non-past) and past tenses formed morphologically, with future and other additional forms made using auxiliaries. In standard German, the compound past (Perfekt) has replaced the simple morphological past in most contexts.

The Romance languages (descendants of Latin) have past, present and future morphological tenses, with additional aspectual distinction in the past. French is an example of a language where, as in German, the simple morphological perfective past (passé simple) has mostly given way to a compound form (passé composé).

Irish, a Celtic language, has past, present and future tenses (see Irish conjugation). The past contrasts perfective and imperfective aspect, and some verbs retain such a contrast in the present. Classical Irish had a three-way aspectual contrast of simple–perfective–imperfective in the past and present tenses. Modern Scottish Gaelic on the other hand only has past, non-past and 'indefinite', and, in the case of the verb 'be' (including its use as an auxiliary), also present tense.

Persian, an Indo-Iranian language, has past and non-past forms, with additional aspectual distinctions. Future can be expressed using an auxiliary, but almost never in non-formal context. Colloquially the perfect suffix -e can be added to past tenses to indicate that an action is speculative or reported (e.g. "it seems that he was doing", "they say that he was doing"). A similar feature is found in Turkish. (For details, see Persian verbs.)

Hindustani (Hindi and Urdu), an Indo-Aryan language, has indicative perfect past and indicative future forms, while the indicative present and indicative imperfect past conjugations exist only for the verb honā (to be). The indicative future is constructed using the future subjunctive conjugations (which used to be the indicative present conjugations in older forms of Hind-Urdu) by adding a future future suffix -gā that declines for gender and the number of the noun that the pronoun refes to. The forms of gā are derived from the perfective participle forms of the verb "to go," jāna. The conjugations of the indicative perfect past and the indicative imperfect past are derived from participles (just like the past tense formation in Slavic languages) and hence they agree with the grammatical number and the gender of noun which the pronoun refers to and not the pronoun itself. The perfect past doubles as the perfective aspect participle and the imperfect past conjugations act as the copula to mark imperfect past when used with the aspectual participles. Hindi-Urdu has an overtly marked tense-aspect-mood system. Periphrastic Hindi-Urdu verb forms (aspectual verb forms) consist of two elements, the first of these two elements is the aspect marker and the second element (the copula) is the common tense-mood marker. Hindi-Urdu has 3 grammatical aspectsː Habitual, Perfective, and Progressive; and 5 grammatical moodsː Indicative, Presumptive, Subjunctive, Contrafactual, and Imperative. (Seeː Hindi verbs)

In the Slavic languages, verbs are intrinsically perfective or imperfective. In Russian and some other languages in the group, perfective verbs have past and "future tenses", while imperfective verbs have past, present and "future", the imperfective "future" being a compound tense in most cases. The "future tense" of perfective verbs is formed in the same way as the present tense of imperfective verbs. However, in South Slavic languages, there may be a greater variety of forms – Bulgarian, for example, has present, past (both "imperfect" and "aorist") and "future tenses", for both perfective and imperfective verbs, as well as perfect forms made with an auxiliary (see Bulgarian verbs). However it doesn't have real future tense, because the future tense is formed by the shortened version of the present of the verb hteti (ще) and it just adds present tense forms of person suffixes: -m (I), -š (you), -ø (he,she,it), -me (we), -te (you, plural), -t (they).

Other languages
Finnish and Hungarian, both members of the Uralic language family, have morphological present (non-past) and past tenses. The Hungarian verb van ("to be") also has a future form.

Turkish verbs conjugate for past, present and future, with a variety of aspects and moods.

Arabic verbs have past and non-past; future can be indicated by a prefix.

Korean verbs have a variety of affixed forms which can be described as representing present, past and future tenses, although they can alternatively be considered to be aspectual. Similarly, Japanese verbs are described as having present and past tenses, although they may be analysed as aspects. Some Wu Chinese languages, such as Shanghainese, use grammatical particles to mark some tenses. Other Chinese languages and many other East Asian languages generally lack inflection and are considered to be tenseless languages, although they often have aspect markers which convey certain information about time reference.

For examples of languages with a greater variety of tenses, see the section on possible tenses, above. Fuller information on tense formation and usage in particular languages can be found in the articles on those languages and their grammars.

Austronesian languages

Rapa 
Rapa is the French Polynesian language of the island of Rapa Iti. Verbs in the indigenous Old Rapa occur with a marker known as TAM which stands for tense, aspect, or mood which can be followed by directional particles or deictic particles. Of the markers there are three tense markers called: Imperfective, Progressive, and Perfective. Which simply mean, Before, Currently, and After. However, specific TAM markers and the type of deictic or directional particle that follows determine and denote different types of meanings in terms of tenses.

Imperfective: denotes actions that have not occurred yet but will occur and expressed by TAM e.

Progressive: Also expressed by TAM e and denotes actions that are currently happening when used with deictic na, and denotes actions that was just witnessed but still currently happening when used with deictic ra.

Perfective: denotes actions that have already occurred or have finished and is marked by TAM ka.

In Old Rapa there are also other types of tense markers known as Past, Imperative, and Subjunctive.

Past

TAM i marks past action. It is rarely used as a matrix TAM and is more frequently observed in past embedded clauses

Imperative

The imperative is marked in Old Rapa by TAM a. A second person subject is implied by the direct command of the imperative.

For a more polite form rather than a straightforward command imperative TAM a is used with adverbial kānei. Kānei is only shown to be used in imperative structures and was translated by the french as "please".

It is also used in a more impersonal form. For example, how you would speak toward a pesky neighbor.

Subjunctive

The subjunctive in Old Rapa is marked by kia and can also be used in expressions of desire

Tokelau 
The Tokelauan language is a tenseless language. The language uses the same words for all three tenses; the phrase E liliu mai au i te Aho Tōnai literally translates to Come back / me / on Saturday, but the translation becomes 'I am coming back on Saturday'.

Wuvulu-Aua 
Wuvulu-Aua does not have an explicit tense, but rather tense is conveyed by mood, aspect markers, and time phrases. Wuvulu speakers use a realis mood to convey past tense as speakers can be certain about events that have occurred.  In some cases, realis mood is used to convey present tense — often to indicate a state of being. Wuvulu speakers use an irrealis mood to convey future tense.
Tense in Wuvulu-Aua may also be implied by using time adverbials and aspectual markings. Wuvulu contains three verbal markers to indicate sequence of events. The preverbal adverbial loʔo 'first' indicates the verb occurs before any other. The postverbal morpheme liai and linia are the respective intransitive and transitive suffixes indicating a repeated action. The postverbal morpheme li and liria are the respective intransitive and transitive suffixes indicating a completed action.

Mortlockese 
Mortlockese uses tense markers such as mii and to denote the present tense state of a subject, aa to denote a present tense state that an object has changed to from a different, past state, kɞ to describe something that has already been completed, pɞ and lɛ to denote future tense, pʷapʷ to denote a possible action or state in future tense, and sæn/mwo for something that has not happened yet. Each of these markers is used in conjunction with the subject proclitics except for the markers aa and mii. Additionally, the marker mii can be used with any type of intransitive verb.

See also
Sequence of tenses
Spatial tense

References

Further reading

External links
 Combinations of Tense, Aspect, and Mood in Greek
 Grammatical Features Inventory

DEIC:deictic
DIR:directional

 
English grammar
Time in linguistics